The 2006–07 Hyundai Mobis Professional Basketball season was the 11th season of the Korean Basketball League.

Regular season

Playoffs

Prize money
Ulsan Mobis Phoebus: KRW 200,000,000 (champions + regular-season 1st place)
Busan KTF Magic Wings: KRW 80,000,000 (runners-up + regular-season 3rd place)
Changwon LG Sakers: KRW 50,000,000 (regular-season 2nd place)

External links
Official KBL website (Korean & English)

2006–07
2006–07 in South Korean basketball
2006–07 in Asian basketball leagues